Malawi were scheduled to make its Paralympic Games début at the 2012 Summer Paralympics in London, United Kingdom, from 29 August to 9 September 2012. On 29 August the team was withdrawn from the games due to lack of funding.

The Malawi Paralympic Committee has reportedly focused on providing training for blind or partially sighted athletes.

Disability classifications
Every participant at the Paralympics has their disability grouped into one of five disability categories; amputation (the condition may be congenital or sustained through injury or illness); cerebral palsy; wheelchair athletes (there is often overlap between this and other categories); visual impairment, including blindness; and Les autres, any physical disability that does not fall strictly under one of the other categories, for example dwarfism or multiple sclerosis. Each Paralympic sport then has its own classifications, dependent upon the specific physical demands of competition. Events are given a code, made of numbers and letters, describing the type of event and classification of the athletes competing. Some sports, such as athletics, divide athletes by both the category and severity of their disabilities, other sports, for example swimming, group competitors from different categories together, the only separation being based on the severity of the disability.

Athletics 

Malawi had originally selected Chisomo Jelemani and Janet Shedani, however their events were not disclosed.

See also
Malawi at the 2012 Summer Olympics

Notes

Nations at the 2012 Summer Paralympics
2012
Paralympics